In the United States, there are three major traditional commercial broadcast television networks — NBC (the National Broadcasting Company), CBS (formerly the Columbia Broadcasting System), and ABC (the American Broadcasting Company) — that due to their longevity and ratings success are referred to as the "Big Three." They dominated American television until the 1990s (especially during the network era of the late 1950s to mid-1980s) and are still considered major U.S. broadcast companies.

Backgrounds 

The National Broadcasting Company and Columbia Broadcasting System were both founded as radio networks in the 1920s, with NBC eventually encompassing two national radio networks, the prestige Red Network and the lower-profile Blue Network. They gradually began experimental television stations in the 1930s, with commercial broadcasts being allowed by the Federal Communications Commission on July 1, 1941. In 1943, the U.S. government determined that NBC's two-network setup was anticompetitive and forced it to spin off one of the networks; NBC chose to sell the Blue Network operations, which became the American Broadcasting Company.

All three networks began regular, commercial television broadcasts in the 1940s. NBC and CBS began commercial operations in 1941, followed by ABC in 1948. A smaller fourth network, the DuMont Television Network, launched in 1944. The three networks originally controlled only a few local television stations, but they quickly affiliated with other stations to cover almost the entire U.S. by the late 1950s. Several of these stations affiliated with all three major networks and DuMont, or some combination of the four, in markets where only one or two television stations operated in the early years of commercial television; this resulted in several network shows, often those with lower national viewership, receiving scattershot market clearances, since in addition to maintaining limited broadcast schedules early on, affiliates that shoehorned programming from many networks had to also make room for locally produced content. As other stations signed on in larger cities, ABC, NBC, and CBS were eventually able to carry at least a sizable portion of their programming on one station.

Of the four original networks, only DuMont did not have a corresponding radio network. Ironically, the fourth major radio network of the era, the Mutual Broadcasting System, had briefly discovered the idea of launching a television network, with consideration being made to have film studio Metro-Goldwyn-Mayer supply programming talent. In fact, Bamberger Broadcasting's WOR-TV and WOIC (both stations affiliated with Mutual, the latter with a Washington, D.C. video outlet) maintained letterhead with "Mutual Television" decorating their identifications. Beyond this, there is no confirmation, however, that a cooperative video service was ever seriously considered, although Mutual's component stations launched television outlets in their home cities. Some of Mutual's component stations bought a stake in the Overmyer Network in 1967, but other than a single late-night talk show, The Las Vegas Show, which lasted one month, that network never made it to its full launch.

Network competition

Early era
For most of the history of television in the United States, the Big Three dominated, controlling the vast majority of television broadcasting. DuMont ceased regular programming in 1955; the NTA Film Network, unusual in that its programming, all pre-recorded, was distributed by mail instead of through communications wires, signed on in 1956 and lasted until 1961. From 1961, and lasting until the early 1990s, there were only three major networks. Every hit series appearing in the Nielsen top 20 television programs and every successful commercial network telecast of a major feature film was aired by one of the Big Three networks.

Fox
A viable fourth television network in the commercial sense would not again become competitive with the Big Three until Fox was founded in October 1986 from some of the assets and remnants of the DuMont network, which had become Metromedia after DuMont folded, and were acquired by News Corporation earlier in 1986. Fox, which began as a distant fourth network, rose to major network status in 1994 after must-carry rules took effect; the rules allowed Fox affiliates to force their way onto cable lineups, and the network's affiliation deal with New World Communications, which it later purchased in 1996, and the acquisition of National Football League broadcast rights brought a wave of new Fox affiliates.

Since its founding, Fox has surpassed ABC and NBC in the ratings during the early primetime hours in which it competes against the longer-established networks, becoming the second most-watched network behind CBS during the 2000s. During the 2007–08 season, Fox was the highest-rated of the major broadcast networks, as well as the first non-Big Three network to reach first place, but it lost the spot in the 2008–09 season and dropped to a close second. From 2004 to 2012, Fox also dominated American television in the lucrative and viewer-rich 18–49 age demographics, in large part due to the success of its NFL coverage and its top rated prime time program, American Idol. Given the network's success in its prime time and sports offerings, it has been occasionally included with the Big Three, in which case the phrase "Big Four" is used.

Although Fox has firmly established itself as the nation's fourth major network with its ratings success, it is not considered part of the Big Three. Among Fox's differences with the Big Three is its reduced weekday programming. It lacks national morning and evening news programs; Fox has a news division consisting of cable and radio operations, but does not provide content for the broadcast television network other than a weekly news analysis program, limited special breaking news reports and an affiliate news service for its stations called Fox News Edge. Fox does not feature any daytime programming, a third hour of prime time, late-night talk shows, or Saturday morning children's programming (though it did previously carry the latter).

Fifth and sixth networks
Other networks eventually launched in an attempt to compete with the Big Three as well as Fox, although these "netlets" have been unable to ascend to the same level of success. The WB and UPN launched in 1995; like Fox, they both added nights of prime time programming over the course of a few years, although The WB was the only one that aired any on weekends, carrying a Sunday night lineup for all but its first half-season on the air.

Both networks mainly aired only prime time and children's programming. The latter was the only form of weekday daytime programming offered by either one, although UPN discontinued its children's lineup in 2003 at the conclusion of a content deal with Disney, and UPN aired sports programming via the short-lived XFL, as well as WWF SmackDown!.

While The WB and UPN each had a few popular series during their existences, they struggled for overall viewership and financial losses. This led their respective parent companies, Time Warner and CBS Corporation, to shut them down and jointly launch The CW in 2006. The CW initially featured a mix of programs from both predecessors, as well as some newer shows after the launch. The last surviving series of The CW's predecessors — Supernatural, from The WB — continued until its finale on The CW in 2020.

Fox launched MyNetworkTV at the same time as The CW, with a lineup of English language telenovelas; it later shifted toward unscripted programs and movies, though its persistent lack of ratings success led News Corporation to convert it into a programming service, relying on a lineup of acquired series, in 2009.

PBS
Likewise, the Public Broadcasting Service (PBS), which has existed since 1970, is not considered part of the "big three" networks. PBS operates as a noncommercial service with a very different distribution form compared to the major networks; its member stations basically own the network instead of the traditional mode of a network owning some of its stations and affiliating with additional stations owned by other broadcasters, and it maintains memberships with more than one educational station in a few markets.

Market share
In the 21st Century, the "Big Three" have controlled only a relatively small portion of the broadcasting market in the United States; by 2007, their collective share was estimated at a combined 32%. The Big Three's market share has declined considerably as a result of growing competition from other broadcast networks such as Fox, The CW, and MyNetworkTV; Spanish language networks such as Univision, UniMás, and Telemundo; national cable and satellite channels such as TNT, ESPN, and AMC; and streaming channels such as Netflix.

Each of the Big Three networks is now owned by a media conglomerate, providing corporate synergy with various cable channels, a major film studio, and other sibling media assets. ABC merged with Capital Cities Communications in 1985, which was then bought by The Walt Disney Company in 1996. NBC and Vivendi Universal's film and television subsidiary Vivendi Universal Entertainment (owner of Universal Pictures) merged in 2004 to form NBCUniversal, which was then bought by Comcast in 2011. In 2000, Viacom (owner of Paramount Pictures) took control of CBS; they then split in 2005, but only to merge back in 2019 into a single company known as ViacomCBS (now known as Paramount Global since 2022).

Each of the Big Three networks have also sought to augment traditional broadcast viewership of entertainment programming with a companion streaming service. Hulu, launched as a shared platform in 2008 and majority-owned by ABC parent Disney since 2019, has become a primary streaming home for ABC. CBS programs are largely carried via Paramount+, begun as CBS All Access in 2014. NBCUniversal, which also has a minority stake in Hulu, launched Peacock in 2020 as the main streaming home for selected series among the NBC broadcast network and its sibling cable channels.

See also
 Network era
 Lists of ABC television affiliates
 Lists of NBC television affiliates
 Lists of CBS television affiliates
 Cable television in the United States
 Communications in the United States
 Fourth television network
 High-definition television in the United States
 List of television stations in the United States
 List of United States cable and satellite television networks
 List of United States over-the-air television networks
 List of United States television markets
 Satellite television in the United States
 Television in the United States
 Television news in the United States
 United States cable news

References

Television in the United States
Television terminology